Paris is a 1937 French comedy drama film directed by Jean Choux and starring Harry Baur, Renée Saint-Cyr and Raymond Segard.

The film's sets were designed by the art director Claude Bouxin.

Cast
 Harry Baur as Alexandre Lafortune  
 Renée Saint-Cyr as Biche  
 Raymond Segard as Antoine  
 Christian Gérard as Coco 
 Camille Bert as Grand-père 
 Colette Borelli 
 Jacques Bousquet 
 Marfa d'Hervilly 
 Fordyce
 Anthony Gildès
 Fred Poulin 
 Rika Radifé 
 Edouard Rousseau 
 Marcelle Servières 
 Odette Talazac

References

Bibliography 
 Alfred Krautz. International directory of cinematographers, set- and costume designers in film, Volume 4. Saur, 1984.

External links 
 

1937 films
French comedy-drama films
1937 comedy-drama films
1930s French-language films
Films directed by Jean Choux
1930s French films